Nychiodes is a genus of moths in the family Geometridae described by Julius Lederer in 1853.

Species
Nychiodes amygdalaria (Herrich-Schäffer, 1848)
Nychiodes andalusiaria Staudinger, 1892 south-western Europe
Nychiodes antiquarius Staudinger, 1892
Nychiodes dalmatina Wagner, 1909 south-eastern Europe
Nychiodes divergaria Staudinger, 1892
Nychiodes hispanica Wehrli, 1929 Spain
Nychiodes obscuraria (Villers, 1789) southern Europe
Nychiodes ragusaria Millière, 1884 southern Europe
Nychiodes rayatica Wiltshire, 1957
Nychiodes torrevinagrensis Expósitio, 1984 Spain
Nychiodes tyttha Prout, 1915 Eritrea
Nychiodes waltheri Wagner, 1919 south-eastern Europe

References

Boarmiini